Cell surface transmembrane glycoprotein CD200 receptor 1 is a protein that in humans is encoded by the CD200R1 gene. CD200R1 is expressed on the surface of myeloid cells  and CD4+ T cells. It interacts with CD200 transmembrane glycoprotein that can be expressed on variety of cells including neurons, epithelial cells, endothelial cells, fibroblasts, and lymphoid cells.

CD200R1 activation regulates the expression of pro-inflammatory molecules such as tumor necrosis factor (TNF-alpha), interferons, and inducible nitric oxide synthase (iNOS).

Function 

This gene encodes a receptor for the OX-2 membrane glycoprotein. Both the receptor and substrate are cell surface glycoproteins containing two immunoglobulin-like domains. This receptor is restricted to the surfaces of myeloid lineage cells and the receptor-substrate interaction may function as a myeloid downregulatory signal. Mouse studies of a related gene suggest that this interaction may control myeloid function in a tissue-specific manner. Alternative splicing of this gene results in multiple transcript variants.

References

Further reading

External links